And Kill Once More, by American novelist Al Fray, was published in 1955 by Graphic Publishing Company, Hasbrouck Heights, N.J.

Plot introduction 

Marty Bowman was an L.A. lifeguard who thought he might like to play detective. 
At a posh house party in the central California mountains he got his chance to play—
for keeps.

Plot summary 

Kate Weston is worried about her friend Sandy Engle. Since her marriage to George Engle, the 
vivacious Sandy has practically become a recluse. Kate's suspicion that something is wrong 
leads her to hire what she thinks is a detective to pose as her boyfriend during a weekend 
house party at the Engle's estate high in the central California mountains. Instead of a 
detective, though—because of a manpower shortage at the Gregory Agency—Kate gets a 
stand-in: Marty Bowman, an L.A. lifeguard with vague ambitions of following in his brother's 
private-eye footsteps. 
 
The guests at the party seem to have little in common until George Engle turns up dead at the
bottom of his swimming pool with Marty Bowman's lucky silver dollar clenched in his fist.
The murder investigation by slow-moving local sheriff Frank Toland finds the thread that 
connects most of the guests: they were being blackmailed by George. Marty becomes the 
prime suspect in the murder and to save his own neck has to stay one step ahead of Toland. 
As he subtly conducts an independent investigation under Toland's nose, Marty discovers that 
in addition to blackmailing his house party guests—and many others—George has conned his 
wife into believing she has tuberculosis. 
 
Slipping past the guard of sheriff Toland's rookie assistant, Marty and Sandy pay an after-hours 
visit to a clinic in the valley, where Marty, with the help of an X-ray technician, proves to 
Sandy that her ill health is an illusion. After bar-hopping with a jubilant Sandy for the rest of 
the evening, Marty resists her drunken advances (and beds Kate instead). The next morning, however, 
Marty finds that Sandy too has been murdered. Unbeknownst to the sheriff, Sandy had retained possession 
of some of the evidence her husband had used to blackmail their guests, a fact that led George's
murderer to kill once more.
 
The murderer, sensing that Marty is closing in on the truth, sets for him the same 
underwater death trap used on George. Fortunately, Marty's familiarity with swimming pool hydraulics 
enables him to anticipate the trap, foil it, and turn the tables 
on the killer. A struggle ensues, followed by the climactic denouement.

1955 American novels
Novels by Al Fray
Novels set in California